is a Japanese tokusatsu television series created by Shotaro Ishinomori and produced by Toei Company. It aired from January 13 until September 28, 1984. It revolves around the adventures of Nick (Nikku), a college student from the Ivy planet (located at the Pleiades) and his arrival on Earth to study the earthlings' behavior. Upon arrival, he is called in for the activities of the evil organization called "Tentacle", whose don, Professor K, wishes to eliminate all children in the world.

The series is rumored to have been inspired by the American DC Comics superhero, Superman, although this was never confirmed by either Ishinomori or Toei.

Plot
Traveling in the spaceship "Space Colony", Nick, with the help of his ball-shaped robot "Ball Boy", arrive on Earth to study the behavior and manners of human beings for his doctoral degree thesis. Under the human identity of a young man named Ken Takase, he meets Maki Hayama, a photographer at Shukan Hit newspaper, and later saves her from a building fall. Maki was taking pictures for a scoop about a building which had been mysteriously demolished. Later, she and Ken find that the evil organization "Tentacle" is behind the demolitions and other evil deeds around the world. Nick then decides to extend his stay on Earth and uses his advanced technology and superior powers to protect Maki and the children of Earth under the alter-ego of Machineman, a red- and yellow-suited superhero. Armed with an advanced technology weapons, he begins fighting Tentacle's cyborgs and protect humankind.

A few episodes later, Machineman succeeds in dismantling Tentacle; however, Professor K flees to Spain and his niece, Lady M, appears. With her aide Tonchinkan, they establish a new organization called "Octopus". Like her uncle, she is allergic to children (whenever she is near one, her nose turns red). In the beginning, she calls up various thieves and legendary criminals from around the world, but later robotic drones are assembled to combat Machineman. By the end of the series, the missing Professor K returns, bringing with him the biggest threat the hero had ever faced: Golden Monsu, a fortified version of Tetsujin Monsu.

Main characters
 : the series' protagonist and main hero, Ken was born at the Ivy Planet and eventually graduated with a degree in Sociology. Upon arriving on Earth, his primary objective is studying human behavior and mannerisms in order to obtain his doctoral degree. However, upon meeting Maki and learn about Tentacle, he decides to stay longer in order to protect her and the children from Professor K's plans.
 : a baseball-shaped robot who is Nick's companion. Smart and clever, it usually serves as his friend, advisor and sidekick, to a certain point. It is also used as a throwing projectile by Machineman in battles, under the name "Fighting Ball". Ironically, Ball Boy says it does not have any information about baseball.
 : a photographer and journalist at Shukan Hit newspaper. She is involved in a traffic accident with Ken and they eventually become friends. She instantly falls for Machineman (exactly like Lois Lane and Superman) after being saved by him, but begins to fall in love with Ken a few episodes later. 
 : Maki's 10-year-old brother. Usually serves as victim of Tentacle's inventions and is saved by Ken/Machineman.
 : The editor-in-chief of Shukan Hit, and Maki's boss.
 : A member of Shukan Hit's junior editorial staff.
 : The greengrocer for the Hayama family.

Criminal Groups

Tentacle

 is the organization led by Professor K.

 : The leader of the Tentacle criminal organization.
 : A humanoid robot that serves as Tentacle's chief executive. In episode 17, Monsu was defeated by Machineman.
 : A robotic parrot created by Professor K, and can speak fluently.

Octopus

 is the succeeding organization led by Lady M, after taking over Tentacle.

 : The niece of Professor K, who made her appearance in Episode 20 after her trip from Spain. She renovated Tentacle's headquarters to form Octopus.
 : Lady M's henchman.

Episodes
 : written by Shozo Uehara, directed by Takeshi Ogasawara
 : written by Shozo Uehara, directed by Takeshi Ogasawara
 : written by Shozo Uehara, directed by Shohei Tojo
 : written by Susumu Takaku, directed by Shohei Tojo
 : written by Susumu Takaku, directed by Takeshi Ogasawara
 : written by Shozo Uehara, directed by Takeshi Ogasawara
 : written by Susumu Takaku, directed by Michio Konishi
 : written by Susumu Takaku, directed by Michio Konishi
 : written by Susumu Takaku, directed by Takeshi Ogasawara 
 : written by Susumu Takaku, directed by Takeshi Ogasawara 
 : written by Shozo Uehara, directed by Shohei Tojo
 : written by Susumu Takaku, directed by Shohei Tojo
 : written by Noboru Sugimura, directed by Takeshi Ogasawara 
 : written by Susumu Takaku, directed by Takeshi Ogasawara 
 : written by Atsuko Osoya, directed by Shohei Tojo
 : written by Susumu Takaku, directed by Shohei Tojo
 : written by Susumu Takaku, directed by Takeshi Ogasawara 
 : written by Noboru Sugimura, directed by Takeshi Ogasawara 
 : written by Susumu Takaku, directed by Shohei Tojo
 : written by Susumu Takaku, directed by Shohei Tojo 
 : written by Noboru Sugimura, directed by Takeshi Ogasawara 
 : written by Susumu Takaku, directed by Takeshi Ogasawara 
 : written by Susumu Takaku, directed by Shohei Tojo 
 : written by Noboru Sugimura, directed by Shohei Tojo
 : written by Isao Matsumoto, directed by Atsuo Okunaka
 : written by Noboru Sugimura, directed by Atsuo Okunaka
 : written by Susumu Takaku and Tatsuro Nagai, directed by Takeshi Ogasawara 
 : written by Noboru Sugimura, directed by Takeshi Ogasawara 
 : written by Noboru Sugimura, directed by Atsuo Okunaka
 : written by Susumu Takaku, directed by Shohei Tojo
 : written by Noboru Sugimura, directed by Shohei Tojo
 : written by Susumu Takaku, directed by Atsuo Okunaka
 : written by Susumu Takaku, directed by Shohei Tojo
 : written by Shozo Uehara, directed by Shohei Tojo
 : written by Shozo Uehara, directed by Shohei Tojo
 : written by Shozo Uehara, directed by Saburo Yatsude

Cast
 Ken Takase (Nick)/Machineman (close-ups): 
 Professor K: Hideyo Amamoto
 Maki Hayama: Kiyomi Tsukada
 Lady M/Meiko: Chiaki Kojo
 Ball Boy (voice): Machiko Soga
 Tetsujin Monsu (voice): Toku Nishio
 Golden Monsu (voice): Shōzō Iizuka
 Machineman (suit actor): 
 Narrator: Osamu Kobayashi

Songs
Opening theme

Lyrics: 
Composition: 
Arrangement: 
Artist: MoJo, Columbia Yurikago Kai

Ending theme

Lyrics: Saburo Yatsude 
Composition: Yuji Ohno
Arrangement: Yuji Ohno
Artist: MoJo

References

Shotaro Ishinomori
Toei tokusatsu
Tokusatsu television series
1984 Japanese television series debuts
1984 Japanese television series endings
Nippon TV original programming
Fictional bounty hunters
Fictional vigilantes